Francesca Schiavone was the defending champion, but withdrew before the tournament began.

Anna Karolína Schmiedlová won the title, defeating Lara Arruabarrena in the final, 6–2, 6–4.

Seeds

Draw

Finals

Top half

Bottom half

Qualifying

Seeds

Qualifiers

Draw

First qualifier

Second qualifier

Third qualifier

Fourth qualifier

Fifth qualifier

Sixth qualifier

References
 Main Draw
 Qualifying Draw

Copa Colsanitas - Singles
2018 Singles